Slapnica can refer to:

 Slapnica, a village near Kakanj, Bosnia and Herzegovina
 Slapnica, Croatia, a hamlet near Samobor, Croatia
 Todorovska Slapnica, a village near Velika Kladuša, Bosnia and Herzegovina